London Stock Exchange (LSE) is a stock exchange in the City of London, England, United Kingdom.  the total market value of all companies trading on LSE was £3.9 trillion. Its current premises are situated in Paternoster Square close to St Paul's Cathedral in the City of London. Since 2007, it has been part of the London Stock Exchange Group (LSEG, that it also lists). The LSE was the most-valued stock exchange in Europe from 2003 when records began until Autumn 2022, when the Paris exchange was briefly larger, until the LSE retook its position as Europe's largest stock exchange 10 days later. According to the 2020 Office for National Statistics report, approximately 12% of UK-resident individuals reported having investments in stocks and shares. According to the 2020 Financial Conduct Authority (FCA) report, approximately 15% of UK adults reported having investments in stocks and shares.

History

Coffee House

The Royal Exchange had been founded by English financier Thomas Gresham and Sir Richard Clough on the model of the Antwerp Bourse. It was opened by Elizabeth I of England in 1571.

During the 17th century, stockbrokers were not allowed in the Royal Exchange due to their rude manners. They had to operate from other establishments in the vicinity, notably Jonathan's Coffee-House. At that coffee house, a broker named John Castaing started listing the prices of a few commodities, such as salt, coal, paper, and exchange rates in 1698. Originally, this was not a daily list and was only published a few days of the week.

This list and activity was later moved to Garraway's coffee house. Public auctions during this period were conducted for the duration that a length of tallow candle could burn; these were known as "by inch of candle" auctions. As stocks grew, with new companies joining to raise capital, the royal court also raised some monies. These are the earliest evidence of organised trading in marketable securities in London.

Royal Exchange
After Gresham's Royal Exchange building was destroyed in the Great Fire of London, it was rebuilt and re-established in 1669. This was a move away from coffee houses and a step towards the modern model of stock exchange.

The Royal Exchange housed not only brokers but also merchants and merchandise. This was the birth of a regulated stock market, which had teething problems in the shape of unlicensed brokers. In order to regulate these, Parliament passed an Act in 1697 that levied heavy penalties, both financial and physical, on those brokering without a licence. It also set a fixed number of brokers (at 100), but this was later increased as the size of the trade grew. This limit led to several problems, one of which was that traders began leaving the Royal Exchange, either by their own decision or through expulsion, and started dealing in the streets of London. The street in which they were now dealing was known as 'Exchange Alley', or 'Change Alley'; it was suitably placed close to the Bank of England. Parliament tried to regulate this and ban the unofficial traders from the Change streets.

Traders became weary of "bubbles" when companies rose quickly and fell, so they persuaded Parliament to pass a clause preventing "unchartered" companies from forming.

After the Seven Years' War (1756–1763), trade at Jonathan's Coffee House boomed again. In 1773, Jonathan, together with 150 other brokers, formed a club and opened a new and more formal "Stock Exchange" in Sweeting's Alley. This now had a set entrance fee, by which traders could enter the stock room and trade securities. It was, however, not an exclusive location for trading, as trading also occurred in the Rotunda of the Bank of England. Fraud was also rife during these times and in order to deter such dealings, it was suggested that users of the stock room pay an increased fee. This was not met well and ultimately, the solution came in the form of annual fees and turning the Exchange into a Subscription room.

The Subscription room created in 1801 was the first regulated exchange in London, but the transformation was not welcomed by all parties. On the first day of trading, non-members had to be expelled by a constable. In spite of the disorder, a new and bigger building was planned, at Capel Court.

William Hammond laid the first foundation stone for the new building on 18 May. It was finished on 30 December when "The Stock Exchange" was incised on the entrance.

First Rule Book

In the Exchange's first operating years, on several occasions there was no clear set of regulations or fundamental laws for the Capel Court trading. In February 1812, the General Purpose Committee confirmed a set of recommendations, which later became the foundation of the first codified rule book of the Exchange. Even though the document was not a complex one, topics such as settlement and default were, in fact, quite comprehensive.

With its new governmental commandments and increasing trading volume, the Exchange was progressively becoming an accepted part of the financial life in the city. In spite of continuous criticism from newspapers and the public, the government used the Exchange's organised market (and would most likely not have managed without it) to raise the enormous amount of money required for the wars against Napoleon.

Foreign and regional exchanges
After the war and facing a booming world economy, foreign lending to countries such as Brazil, Peru and Chile was a growing market. Notably, the Foreign Market at the Exchange allowed for merchants and traders to participate, and the Royal Exchange hosted all transactions where foreign parties were involved. The constant increase in overseas business eventually meant that dealing in foreign securities had to be allowed within all of the Exchange's premises.

Just as London enjoyed growth through international trade, the rest of Great Britain also benefited from the economic boom. Two other cities, in particular, showed great business development: Liverpool and Manchester. Consequently, in 1836 both the Manchester and Liverpool stock exchanges were opened. Some stock prices sometimes rose by 10%, 20% or even 30% in a week. These were times when stockbroking was considered a real business profession, and such attracted many entrepreneurs. Nevertheless, with booms came busts, and in 1835 the "Spanish panic" hit the markets, followed by a second one two years later.

The Exchange before the World Wars

By June 1853, both participating members and brokers were taking up so much space that the Exchange was now uncomfortably crowded, and continual expansion plans were taking place. Having already been extended west, east, and northwards, it was then decided the Exchange needed an entire new establishment. Thomas Allason was appointed as the main architect, and in March 1854, the new brick building inspired from the Great Exhibition stood ready. This was a huge improvement in both surroundings and space, with twice the floor space available.

By the late 1800s, the telephone, ticker tape, and the telegraph had been invented. Those new technologies led to a revolution in the work of the Exchange.

First World War
As the financial centre of the world, both the City and the Stock Exchange were hit hard by the outbreak of World War I in 1914. Due to fears that borrowed money was to be called in and that foreign banks would demand their loans or raise interest, prices surged at first. The decision to close the Exchange for improved breathing space and to extend the August Bank Holiday to prohibit a run on banks, was hurried through by the committee and Parliament, respectively. The Stock Exchange ended up being closed from the end of July until the New Year, causing street business to be introduced again, as well as the "challenge system".

The Exchange was set to open again on 4 January 1915 under tedious restrictions: transactions were to be in cash only. Due to the limitations and challenges on trading brought by the war, almost a thousand members quit the Exchange between 1914 and 1918. When peace returned in November 1918, the mood on the trading floor was generally cowed. In 1923, the Exchange received its own coat of arms, with the motto Dictum Meum Pactum, My Word is My Bond.

Second World War
In 1937, officials at the Exchange used their experiences from World War I to draw up plans for how to handle a new war. The main concerns included air raids and the subsequent bombing of the Exchange's perimeters, and one suggestion was a move to Denham, Buckinghamshire. This however never took place. On the first day of September 1939, the Exchange closed its doors "until further notice" and two days later World War II was declared. Unlike in the prior war, the Exchange opened its doors again six days later, on 7 September.

As the war escalated into its second year, the concerns for air raids were greater than ever. Eventually, on the night of 29 December 1940, one of the greatest fires in London's history took place. The Exchange's floor was hit by a clutch of incendiary bombs, which were extinguished quickly. Trading on the floor was now drastically low and most was done over the phone to reduce the possibility of injuries.

The Exchange was only closed for one more day during wartime, in 1945 due to damage from a V-2 rocket. Nonetheless, trading continued in the house's basement.

Post-war

After decades of uncertain if not turbulent times, stock market business boomed in the late 1950s. This spurred officials to find new, more suitable accommodation. The work on the new Stock Exchange Tower began in 1967. Queen Elizabeth II opened the building on 8 November 1972; it was a new City landmark, with its  trading floor.

1973 marked a year of changes for the Stock Exchange. First, two trading prohibitions were abolished. A report from the Monopolies and Mergers Commission recommended the admittance of both women and foreign-born members on the floor. Second, in March the London Stock Exchange formally merged with the eleven British and Irish regional exchanges, including the Scottish Stock Exchange. This expansion led to the creation of a new position of Chief Executive Officer; after an extensive search this post was given to Robert Fell. There were more governance changes in 1991, when the governing Council of the Exchange was replaced by a Board of Directors drawn from the Exchange's executive, customer, and user base; and the trading name became "The London Stock Exchange".

FTSE 100 Index (pronounced "Footsie 100") was launched by a partnership of the Financial Times and the Stock Exchange on 3 January 1984. This turned out to be one of the most useful indices of all, and tracked the movements of the 100 leading companies listed on the Exchange.

IRA bombing

On 20 July 1990, a bomb planted by the Provisional Irish Republican Army (IRA) exploded in the men's toilets behind the visitors' gallery. The area had already been evacuated and nobody was injured. About 30 minutes before the blast at 8:49 a.m., a man who said he was a member of the IRA told Reuters that a bomb had been placed at the exchange and was about to explode. Police officials said that if there had been no warning, the human toll would have been very high. The explosion ripped a hole in the 23-storey building in Threadneedle Street and sent a shower of glass and concrete onto the street. The long-term trend towards electronic trading platforms reduced the Exchange's attraction to visitors, and although the gallery reopened, it was closed permanently in 1992.

"Big Bang"
The biggest event of the 1980s was the sudden de-regulation of the financial markets in the UK in 1986. The phrase "Big Bang" was coined to describe measures, including abolition of fixed commission charges and of the distinction between stockjobbers and stockbrokers on the London Stock Exchange, as well as the change from an open outcry to electronic, screen-based trading.

In 1995, the Exchange launched the Alternative Investment Market, the AIM, to allow growing companies to expand into international markets. Two years later, the Electronic Trading Service (SETS) was launched, bringing greater speed and efficiency to the market. Next, the CREST settlement service was launched. In 2000, the Exchange's shareholders voted to become a public limited company, London Stock Exchange plc. London Stock Exchange also transferred its role as UK Listing Authority to the Financial Services Authority (FSA-UKLA).

EDX London, an international equity derivatives business, was created in 2003 in partnership with OM Group. The Exchange also acquired Proquote Limited, a new generation supplier of real-time market data and trading systems.

The old Stock Exchange Tower became largely redundant with Big Bang, which deregulated many of the Stock Exchange's activities: computerised systems and dealing rooms replaced face-to-face trading. In 2004, LondonStock Exchange moved to a brand-new headquarters in Paternoster Square, close to St Paul's Cathedral.

In 2007, the London Stock Exchange merged with Borsa Italiana, creating London Stock Exchange Group (LSEG). The Group's headquarters are in Paternoster Square.

The Stock Exchange in Paternoster Square was the initial target for the protesters of Occupy London on 15 October 2011. Attempts to occupy the square were thwarted by police. Police sealed off the entrance to the square as it is private property, a High Court injunction having previously been granted against public access to the square. The protesters moved nearby to occupy the space in front of St Paul's Cathedral. The protests were part of the global Occupy movement.

On 25 April 2019, the final day of the Extinction Rebellion disruption in London, 13 activists glued themselves together in a chain, blocking the entrances of the Stock Exchange. The protesters were all later arrested on suspicion of aggravated trespass. Extinction Rebellion had said its protesters would target the financial industry "and the corrosive impacts of the ... sector on the world we live in" and activists also blocked entrances to HM Treasury and the Goldman Sachs office on Fleet Street.

Activities

Primary markets
There are two main markets on which companies trade on the LSE:

Main Market
The main market is home to over 1,300 large companies from 60 countries. The FTSE 100 Index ("footsie") is the main share index of the 100 most highly capitalised UK companies listed on the Main Market.

Alternative Investment Market
The Alternative Investment Market is LSE's international market for smaller companies. A wide range of businesses including early-stage, venture capital-backed, as well as more-established companies join AIM seeking access to growth capital. The AIM is classified as a Multilateral Trading Facility (MTF) under the 2004 MiFID directive, and as such it is a flexible market with a simpler admission process for companies wanting to be publicly listed.

Secondary markets
The securities available for trading on London Stock Exchange:

 Common stock
 Bonds, including retail bonds
 Derivatives
 Exchange-traded funds
 Debt securities
 Exchange-traded commodities
 Structured products
 Covered warrants
 Global depositary receipts (GDRs)
 Gilt-edged securities

Post trade
Through the Exchange's Italian arm, Borsa Italiana, the London Stock Exchange Group as a whole offers clearing and settlement services for trades through CC&G (Cassa di Compensazione e Garanzia) and Monte Titoli. is the Groups Central Counterparty (CCP) and covers multiple asset classes throughout the Italian equity, derivatives and bond markets. CC&G also clears Turquoise derivatives. Monte Titoli (MT) is the pre-settlement, settlement, custody and asset services provider of the Group. MT operates both on-exchange and OTC trades with over 400 banks and brokers.

Technology
London Stock Exchange's trading platform is its own Linux-based edition named Millennium Exchange.

Their previous trading platform TradElect was based on Microsoft's .NET Framework, and was developed by Microsoft and Accenture. For Microsoft, LSE was a good combination of a highly visible exchange and yet a relatively modest IT problem.

Despite TradElect only being in use for about two years, after suffering multiple periods of extended downtime and unreliability the LSE announced in 2009 that it was planning to switch to Linux in 2010. The main market migration to MillenniumIT technology was successfully completed in February 2011.

LSEG provides high-performance technology, including trading, market surveillance and post-trade systems, for over 40 organisations and exchanges, including the Group's own markets. Additional services include network connectivity, hosting and quality assurance testing. MillenniumIT, GATElab and Exactpro are among the Group's technology companies.

The LSE facilitates stock listings in a currency other than its "home currency". Most stocks are quoted in GBP but some are quoted in EUR while others are quoted in USD.

Mergers and acquisitions
On 3 May 2000, it was announced that the LSE would merge with the Deutsche Börse; however this fell through.

On 23 June 2007, the London Stock Exchange announced that it had agreed on the terms of a recommended offer to the shareholders of the Borsa Italiana S.p.A. The merger of the two companies created a leading diversified exchange group in Europe. The combined group was named the London Stock Exchange Group, but still remained two separate legal and regulatory entities. One of the long-term strategies of the joint company is to expand Borsa Italiana's efficient clearing services to other European markets.

In 2007, after Borsa Italiana announced that it was exercising its call option to acquire full control of MBE Holdings; thus the combined Group would now control Mercato dei Titoli di Stato, or MTS. This merger of Borsa Italiana and MTS with LSE's existing bond-listing business enhanced the range of covered European fixed income markets.

London Stock Exchange Group acquired Turquoise (TQ), a Pan-European MTF, in 2009.

On 9 October 2020, London Stock Exchange agreed to sell the Borsa Italiana (including Borsa's bond trading platform MTS) to Euronext for €4.3 billion (£3.9 billion) in cash. Euronext completed the acquisition of the Borsa Italiana Group on 29 April 2021 for a final price of €4,444 million.

On 12 Dec 2022, Microsoft buys nearly 4% stack in LSE(London Stock Exchange Group) as part of 10-Year cloud deal.

NASDAQ bids
In December 2005, London Stock Exchange rejected a £1.6 billion takeover offer from Macquarie Bank. London Stock Exchange described the offer as "derisory", a sentiment echoed by shareholders in the Exchange. Shortly after Macquarie withdrew its offer, the LSE received an unsolicited approach from NASDAQ valuing the company at £2.4 billion. This too it rejected. NASDAQ later pulled its bid, and less than two weeks later on 11 April 2006, struck a deal with LSE's largest shareholder, Ameriprise Financial's Threadneedle Asset Management unit, to acquire all of that firm's stake, consisting of 35.4 million shares, at £11.75 per share. NASDAQ also purchased 2.69 million additional shares, resulting in a total stake of 15%. While the seller of those shares was undisclosed, it occurred simultaneously with a sale by Scottish Widows of 2.69 million shares. The move was seen as an effort to force LSE to the negotiating table, as well as to limit the Exchange's strategic flexibility.

Subsequent purchases increased NASDAQ's stake to 25.1%, holding off competing bids for several months. United Kingdom financial rules required that NASDAQ wait for a period of time before renewing its effort. On 20 November 2006, within a month or two of the expiration of this period, NASDAQ increased its stake to 28.75% and launched a hostile offer at the minimum permitted bid of £12.43 per share, which was the highest NASDAQ had paid on the open market for its existing shares. The LSE immediately rejected this bid, stating that it "substantially undervalues" the company.

NASDAQ revised its offer (characterized as an "unsolicited" bid, rather than a "hostile takeover attempt") on 12 December 2006, indicating that it would be able to complete the deal with 50% (plus one share) of LSE's stock, rather than the 90% it had been seeking. The U.S. exchange did not, however, raise its bid. Many hedge funds had accumulated large positions within the LSE, and many managers of those funds, as well as Furse, indicated that the bid was still not satisfactory. NASDAQ's bid was made more difficult because it had described its offer as "final", which, under British bidding rules, restricted their ability to raise its offer except under certain circumstances.

In the end, NASDAQ's offer was roundly rejected by LSE shareholders. Having received acceptances of only 0.41% of rest of the register by the deadline on 10 February 2007, Nasdaq's offer duly lapsed.

On 20 August 2007, NASDAQ announced that it was abandoning its plan to take over the LSE and subsequently look for options to divest its 31% (61.3 million shares) shareholding in the company in light of its failed takeover attempt. In September 2007, NASDAQ agreed to sell the majority of its shares to Borse Dubai, leaving the United Arab Emirates-based exchange with 28% of the LSE.

Proposed merger with TMX Group
On 9 February 2011, London Stock Exchange Group announced it had agreed to merge with the Toronto-based TMX Group, the owners of the Toronto Stock Exchange, creating a combined entity with a market capitalization of listed companies equal to £3.7 trillion. Xavier Rolet, CEO of the LSE Group at the time, would have headed the new enlarged company, while TMX Chief Executive Thomas Kloet would have become the new firm president. London Stock Exchange Group however announced it was terminating the merger with TMX on 29 June 2011 citing that "LSEG and TMX Group believe that the merger is highly unlikely to achieve the required two-thirds majority approval at the TMX Group shareholder meeting". Even though LSEG obtained the necessary support from its shareholders, it failed to obtain the required support from TMX's shareholders.

Opening times
Normal trading sessions on the main orderbook (SETS) are from 08:00 to 16:30 local time every day of the week except Saturdays, Sundays and holidays declared by the exchange in advance. The detailed schedule is as follows:

 Trade reporting 07:15–07:50
 Opening auction 07:50–08:00
 Continuous trading 08:00–16:30
 Closing auction 16:30–16:35
 Order maintenance 16:35–17:00
 Trade reporting only 17:00–17:15

Auction Periods (SETQx)

SETSqx (Stock Exchange Electronic Trading Service – quotes and crosses) is a trading service for securities less liquid than those traded on SETS.

The auction uncrossings are scheduled to take place at 8am, 9am, 11am, 2pm, and 4:35pm.

Holidays are currently: New Year's Day, Good Friday, Easter Monday, May Bank Holiday, Spring Bank Holiday, Summer Bank Holiday, Christmas Day, and Boxing Day. If New Year's Day, Christmas Day, and/or Boxing Day is on a weekend, the following working day is a holiday.

Arms

See also

 List of stock exchanges
 List of stock exchanges in the Commonwealth of Nations
 List of stock exchanges in the United Kingdom, the British Crown Dependencies and United Kingdom Overseas Territories
 Mandatory quote period
 Stock Exchange forgery 1872–73
 TAURUS (share settlement)

References

Further reading

External links 

 
 

 

 
Buildings and structures in the City of London
Financial services companies established in 1801
British companies established in 1801
Companies formerly listed on the London Stock Exchange
Economy of London
Financial services companies of the United Kingdom
Organisations based in the City of London
Stock exchanges in the United Kingdom
1801 establishments in England